Ormond is a small settlement inland from Gisborne, in the northeast of New Zealand's North Island. It is located on State Highway 2 in the valley of the Waipaoa River, halfway between Gisborne and the township of Te Karaka.

Education
Ormond School is a Year 1-6 co-educational state primary school. In 2019, it was a decile 6 school with a roll of 90.

References

Populated places in the Gisborne District